The 1972 Montana State Bobcats football team was an American football team that represented Montana State University in the Big Sky Conference during the 1972 NCAA College Division football season. In their second season under head coach Sonny Holland, the Bobcats compiled an 8–3 record (5–1 against Big Sky opponents) and won the Big Sky championship.

For this season only, home games were played at Van Winkle Stadium at Bozeman High School.

The Bobcat offense featured flanker Sam McCullum, who led the conference in scoring.

Schedule

References

Montana State
Montana State Bobcats football seasons
Big Sky Conference football champion seasons
Montana State Bobcats football